The Hershkovitz's marmoset (Mico intermedius), also known as the Aripuanã marmoset is a marmoset species endemic to the south-central Amazon rainforest in Brazil. The common name is a reference to American zoologist Philip Hershkovitz.

References

External links

Hershkovitz's marmoset
Mammals of Brazil
Endemic fauna of Brazil
Hershkovitz's marmoset
Taxobox binomials not recognized by IUCN
Taxa named by Philip Hershkovitz